Volzhskoye is a rural locality (a selo) and the administrative center of Volzhsky Selsoviet, Narimanovsky District, Astrakhan Oblast, Russia. The population was 3,133 as of 2010. There are 23 streets.

Geography 
Volzhskoye is located 5 km south of Narimanov (the district's administrative centre) by road. Narimanov is the nearest rural locality.

References 

Rural localities in Narimanovsky District